Opistomum pallidum is a species of rhabdocoel flatworm in the family Typhloplanidae.

Description 
The animal is 2 to 4.5 mm long. It possesses no eyes. The pharynx is caudally oriented and situated near the posterior end of the body.

Taxonomy 
The species was described by Eduard Oscar Schmidt in 1848.

Distribution and Habitat 
It is known from Europe and Virginia (USA). It inhabits freshwater habitats, but is absent from streams and rivers.

Ecology and behavior 

The species is found in Autumn, Winter and Spring. It is known to feed on naidid oligochaetes.

References 

Taxa named by Eduard Oscar Schmidt
Rhabdocoela